Off the Ground is the ninth solo studio album by Paul McCartney, released on 2 February 1993. As his first studio album of the 1990s, it is also the follow-up to the well received Flowers in the Dirt (1989).

Recording and structure
After planning another world tour, The New World Tour, in 1993, to promote the album, McCartney chose to record Off the Ground with his touring band. Blair Cunningham joined on drums to replace Chris Whitten, who left to join Dire Straits.

McCartney decided to record the album "live in the studio", meaning that the band would rehearse an entire song then record it in one take, instead of recording each vocal track and instrumental track separately. This approach gave a raw, direct feel to the work.

The compositions, some of which were outtakes from Flowers in the Dirt, seemed less complex than those on the earlier album. "Mistress and Maid" and "The Lovers That Never Were", which emerged from McCartney's songwriting collaboration with Elvis Costello, made their appearance on this album. Costello, who had performed on Flowers in the Dirt, did not appear on Off the Ground.

The first two songs taped were "Biker like an Icon" and "Peace in the Neighbourhood", both derived from some album rehearsals in November 1991.

McCartney's increased interest in social issues came to prominence on this album, with the anti animal cruelty rocker "Looking for Changes" (McCartney and his wife Linda both being long time vegetarians by this time) and paeans for a better world ("Hope of Deliverance" and "C'Mon People"). The B-Side "Big Boys Bickering" lambasted politicians, with the phrase "Big boys bickering, fucking it up for everyone" showing a more aggressive side of McCartney and rare use of a swear word in the song. Another notable B-Side is "Long Leather Coat", a protest song co-written by Linda McCartney.

The CD's hidden track, a short excerpt of "Cosmically Conscious", was written by McCartney in 1968 during The Beatles' stay in Rishikesh. A full-length version of the recording was released as the B-Side of the "Off the Ground" single and later included on Off the Ground: The Complete Works.

The feet on the album cover are of McCartney, his wife Linda, and his touring band.

Release and reception

The lead single, "Hope of Deliverance", was released in the last week of December 1992 and the album followed on 2 February 1993. Off the Ground was the first Paul McCartney album to contain no sizeable US hit singles since Wings' Wild Life in 1971. The album's first single barely reached the top 20, hitting number 18, in the UK, where "C'Mon People" became a minor hit as well. In the US, the album's title track also entered the Adult Contemporary chart at number 27. Singles from Off the Ground floundered on the US and the UK charts. However, "Hope of Deliverance" achieved commercial success elsewhere. It became McCartney's first international hit single since "Say, Say, Say" with Michael Jackson in 1983, cracking the top 5 on the charts in over five European territories except his homeland and selling over 250,000 copies in Germany alone.

In the United Kingdom, the album itself debuted at number 5 and quickly fell off the chart, spending only 6 weeks inside the top 100. In the United States, it peaked at the number 17 on the Billboard 200 with the first-week sales of only 53,000 copies, managing to receive Gold by the Recording Industry Association of America. Although it met with mixed reviews from critics and suffered from lackluster sales in the UK and North America, the album fared better in other key markets such as Spain. In Japan, it surpassed its predecessor Flowers in the Dirt in cumulative sales. In Germany, Off the Ground has been McCartney's best-selling album, spending 20 weeks on the top-ten and eventually achieving Platinum for shipments of over half a million copies.

Some weeks after its release, McCartney launched "The New World Tour", taking in many successful shows across the globe during the summer months. These gigs were documented on the album Paul Is Live, which followed at the end of 1993.

Track listing

Off the Ground: The Complete Works

Off the Ground: The Complete Works is a two-disc set released in Germany and the Netherlands. The first disc contains the original Off the Ground album, with the second collecting various B-sides and two previously unreleased tracks from his 1991 MTV Unplugged concert, "Things We Said Today" and "Midnight Special", which were later released as B-sides to the single "Biker Like an Icon."

Despite the title, the set is missing two B-sides, three promo remixes, one promo B-side, and one international single mix:  "Deliverance" and "Deliverance (Dub Mix)", dance-oriented reworkings by Steve Anderson of the song "Hope of Deliverance", released as B-sides of the "C'mon People" CD single No. 1; the three promo remixes of "Off the Ground" released to American radio, namely the Bob Clearmountain remix, the Keith Cohen remix, and the Keith Cohen AC remix; the MTV Unplugged outtake "Mean Woman Blues", which was a B-side of the "Biker Like An Icon" promo CD single, and the single mix of "Off the Ground" contained on the EU and Japanese CD singles.

Off the Ground: The Complete Works has not been reissued and is now out of print and not legally for sale as a digital download.

Track listing

Personnel
Paul McCartney – vocals, bass guitar, piano, mellotron, celesta, Wurlitzer electric piano, electric guitars, acoustic guitars, Spanish guitar, ocarina, percussion, sitar, drums
Linda McCartney – vocals, autoharp, celesta, harmonium, minimoog, keyboards, percussion, whistle
Hamish Stuart – vocals, electric guitar, acoustic guitar, 12 string guitar, bass guitar, percussion, piano
Robbie McIntosh – electric guitars, acoustic guitars, Spanish guitar, slide guitar, mandolin, backing vocals
Paul Wickens – keyboards, piano, hammond organ, clavinet, synthesizer, accordion, LinnDrum, drum programming, percussion, backing vocals
Blair Cunningham – drums, congas, percussion, backing vocals

Charts

Weekly charts

Year-end charts

Certifications and sales

References

External links

Paul McCartney albums
1993 albums
Parlophone albums
Albums produced by Paul McCartney
Albums produced by Julian Mendelsohn